Piercebridge Roman Bridge is the ruin of a Roman bridge over the River Tees, northern England. It is near the villages of Cliffe (North Yorkshire) and Piercebridge, County Durham.

The most recent excavations were by Channel 4's Time Team in 2009.

History

The bridge carried Dere Street Roman road across the river.

Piercebridge Roman Fort guarded the bridge.

The first bridge was built around 90 AD, but this may have been replaced by a second bridge after it was washed away.

Remains

What remains of the bridge are massive masonry blocks that formed at least five piers. The lower courses of one of the abutments still stand, partially complete, and it is possible to see the holes into which the wooden structure of the bridge would have fitted. All of the timber has disappeared in the nearly 16 centuries since the end of the Roman occupation. The remains were discovered in 1972 during gravel quarrying. Artifacts from the excavation of the bridge and fort are held in the Bowes Museum.

Alternative interpretation
Whilst the majority opinion among archaeologists is that the structure is a bridge, an alternative interpretation has been proposed by archaeologist Raymond Selkirk, who contends that the structure is a navigation dam with an overspill channel. From this, and other evidence he argues that the Romans made far greater use of river transport than is generally recognised. His views are set out in his books The Piercebridge Formula (1983), On the Trail of the Legions (1995) and Chester-le-Street & Its Place in History (2000).

See also

List of Roman bridges
Roman architecture
Roman engineering

References

External links

English Heritage sites in North Yorkshire
Bridges in Roman Britain
Roman sites in North Yorkshire
Tourist attractions in North Yorkshire
Scheduled monuments in North Yorkshire
Crossings of the River Tees